MV St Faith is a vehicle and passenger ferry operated by Wightlink on its route from Portsmouth to Fishbourne on the Isle of Wight. As with former sister ship , there were plans to increase St Faith′s capacity by extending her length by 12 metres. Entering service in 1990, St Faith is the second youngest of Wightlink's 'St Class' ships, after .  The name is taken from St Faith's Church, Cowes.

Incidents

Hitting hard
On 28 May 2010, it was reported that on arrival at Portsmouth, the St Faith collided heavily with the dock, injuring two passengers and causing minor damage. Following the accident the vessel was temporarily withdrawn from service and paramedics called as a precaution.

Breakdown in the middle of the Solent
On 28 February 2015 the St Faith suffered an engine failure in the middle of the Solent around 20 minutes into the 8am crossing to the Isle of Wight. The captain  decided to return to Portsmouth. The tug  towed the 25-year-old ferry back to the Gunwharf Quays terminal. After repairs, St Faith returned to service on 13 March 2015.

Mid-Solent Fire
On 19 January 2017 a fire broke out below the port side bridge wing of St Faith whilst mid-Solent in what was later identified as a cigarette bin. The blaze was swiftly dealt with by the crew. There were 65 people on board the ferry at the time of the incident but there were no casualties.

Two fire appliances from Ryde Fire Station were sent to the scene at Wightlink's Fishbourne ferry terminal alongside the Isle of Wight Fire and Rescue Service's Incident Support Unit from East Cowes. Bembridge Coastguard Rescue Team, the Isle of Wight Ambulance Service and Police also attended the incident.

References

External links
 Wightlink website - wightlink.co.uk

Ships of Wightlink
Ships built in Selby
1990 ships